Bramer Banking Corporation, commonly known as Bramer Bank, is a financial institution based in Mauritius with its head office is situated at Port Louis and currently under statutory management. It was one of the commercial banks licensed by the Bank of Mauritius, the country's central bank and the nation's banking regulator.

Overview 
Bramer Bank was part of the British American Investment Group, formerly one of the largest conglomerates in Mauritius with investments in banking, insurance, asset and wealth management, trade & commerce and services in Bahamas, East Africa, Mauritius, Malta, South Africa and UK.

History

Founding 
Bramer Banking Corporation Limited was formed on February 29, 1988 as South East Asian Bank Limited (SEAB) as a subsidiary of Bumiputra Commerce Bank (now CIMB bank) of Malaysia. In March 1990, SEAB took over the banking business of Habib Bank AG Zurich in Mauritius. In January 2003, CIMB bank increased its stake in SEAB to 60% subsidiary of CIMB.

Growth Years 
In 2008, British American Investment Group acquired full control of South East Asian Bank and subsequently rebranded it to Bramer Banking Corporation. On May 9, 2012 Bramer Banking Corporation's stock began trading on the Stock Exchange of Mauritius (SEM) after the amalgamation of its business with The Mauritius Leasing Company (“MLC”) that was listed on the SEM and Bramer Holding Company. The amalgamation made Bramer Banking Corporation the third largest lender in Mauritius by market capitalisation and it remained a subsidiary of the British American Investment Group.

Liquidity Crisis and Closure 
On April 2, 2015 Bramer Banking Corporation's banking license was revoked by the Bank of Mauritius to avoid systemic risks to the domestic financial system. Indeed, Bramer Bank had been experiencing large withdrawals of deposits placing it in a precarious liquidity situation in an alleged Ponzi scheme.  A situation that was further worsened by Bramer Bank’s difficulty to raise funds on the interbank market. As a result, it was relying on overnight facilities from the Bank of Mauritius from March 6, 2015 in order to meet daily cash flow requirements. This liquidity crisis also affected Bramer Banking Corporation's sister company BAI Co. Both firm's stock were suspended from trading on the same day.

The Bank of Mauritius appointed Messrs. Mushtaq Oosman and Andre Bonieux of PricewaterhouseCoopers as the receivers pursuant to section 75 of the Banking Act 2004.

A new newly formed state owned bank known as the National Commercial Bank was incorporated and took over all the assets and liabilities of Bramer Banking Corporation. The State Bank of Mauritius  provided limited assistance to the new bank.

Ownership 
As of December 31, 2013, the shareholding of Bramer Banking Corporation was as follows:

See also
List of banks in Mauritius
British American Investment Company (Mauritius)
British-American Investments Company

References

External links
 Bramer Corporation Limited
 British American Investment Co. (Mtius) Ltd
 Website of Bank of Mauritius

Banks of Mauritius
Companies listed on the Stock Exchange of Mauritius
Companies based in Port Louis
Banks established in 1988
1988 establishments in Mauritius
Bank failures
Banks disestablished in 2015
2015 disestablishments in Mauritius